Lisana is a village in Rewari of Rewari block, in the Indian state of Haryana.

Polytechnic

Demographics of 2011
As of 2011 India census, Lisana, Rewari had a population of 1852 in 346 households. Males (997) constitute 53.83%  of the population and females (855) 46.16%. Lisana has an average literacy (1226) rate of 66.19%, lower than the national average of 74%: male literacy (753) is 61.41%, and female literacy (473) is 38.58% of total literates(1226). In Lisana, 14.09% of the population is under 6 years of age (261).

Adjacent villages
Gokalgarh
Bikaner
Newgone
Gindokhar
Kaluwas
Ghasera

References

Villages in Rewari district